Association de médiation sociale v Union locale des syndicats CGT (2014) C-176/12 is an EU law case, concerning the protection of human rights in the European Union.

Facts
The Charter of Fundamental Rights of the European Union article 27 says workers must be ‘guaranteed information and consultation in good time’. This was implemented by the Information and Consultation Directive 2002 (2002/14/EC) in part. The French Labour Code, article L. 1111-3 excluded workers with non-standard employment contracts from staff numbers to determine legal thresholds for constituting bodies representing staff. The Union locale des syndicats CGT, a trade union, claimed this violated both the Charter and the Directive.

In his Opinion, Advocate General Cruz Villalón opposed the direct applicability of the Charter. He said ‘the recognition of particular economic and social rights would result in the judicialisation of public policy, particularly in areas of significant budgetary importance.’

Judgment
The Court of Justice, Grand Chamber, held the Directive article 2(d) and article 3 defines who is to be included in its scope, and does not allow the exclusion of certain groups of workers when calculating the number of staff. However the Charter article 27 was not precise enough to say that national law could not exclude some categories of workers.

See also

European Union law

Notes

References

Court of Justice of the European Union case law